Francis Trasuns (October 16, 1864 – April 6, 1926) was a Latgalian priest, theologian and politician. He was a member of the State Duma of the Russian Empire (in 1906) and a member of the Latvian parliament (1922–1926). All his life, Trasuns was an active promoter and protector of the Latgalian language and culture.

Early life and education 
Trasuns was a student of the Jelgava Gymnasium, then from 1883 to 1887 he studied in Saint Petersburg's theological seminary, and eventually, in 1887, he joined the Saint Petersburg Roman Catholic Theological Academy and graduated it in 1891. From 1902, Trasuns worked as a professor in the Saint Petersburg's theological seminary. One of his achievements was that some of his lectures were held in the Latgalian language.

References 

1864 births
1926 deaths
People from Rēzekne Municipality
People from Rezhitsky Uyezd
19th-century Roman Catholic priests from the Russian Empire
Latgalian Christian Peasant and Catholic Party politicians
Members of the 1st State Duma of the Russian Empire
Members of the People's Council of Latvia
Deputies of the Constitutional Assembly of Latvia
Deputies of the 1st Saeima
Deputies of the 2nd Saeima
Latvian theologians